Diocese of Kilmore may refer to:
 Roman Catholic Diocese of Kilmore
 Diocese of Kilmore, Elphin and Ardagh, the Church of Ireland diocese since 1841